Allen Krughoff (born ) is an American male cyclo-cross cyclist. He represented his nation in the men's elite event at the 2016 UCI Cyclo-cross World Championships  in Heusden-Zolder.

References

External links
 Profile at cyclingarchives.com

1984 births
Living people
Cyclo-cross cyclists
American male cyclists
Place of birth missing (living people)